Griselda Álvarez Ponce de León (5 April 1913 – 26 March 2009) was the first female governor in Mexico. Álvarez was Governor of the state of Colima from 1979 to 1985.

Biography
She was born in Guadalajara, Jalisco, capital of Colima's northern neighbor, where her family lived after the most violent eruption in modern history of the Volcano of Fire in Colima. The eruption began 20 January 1913 and continued for four days.   She was born into one of the most important families in Colima. Her parents were Miguel Álvarez García and María Dolores Guadalupe Eugenia Ponce de León.

Her father at the time of her birth was a soldier in the Army, but later was governor of Colima from 1919 until 1923. Her great-grandfather, General Manuel Álvarez, a delegate in the Constituent Congress, was designated the highest political figure in the territory of Colima in 1826. In 1857 when Colima became a state, he became its first governor.

She died in Mexico City, aged 95.

Writing career
Griselda Álvarez studied at the National Autonomous University of Mexico (UNAM) and received her degree in writing and composition. She then began her work as a poet and writer.

Her works include:
Cementerio de Pájaros 1956
Dos cantos 1959
Desierta compañía 1961
Letanía erótica para la paz 1963
La sombra niña 1965
Anatomía superficial 1967
Estación sin nombre 1972

While composing her works, she was also working as a teacher, but eventually she entered public service.  While she did not abandon her work as a teacher, she took a post in the public sector working under the secretary of education, and moved into the realm of social work eventually becoming the director of volunteer services in the federal social security institute.

Public office
Álvarez left to serve as Senator from the state of Jalisco from 1976 to 1979, then as Governor of Colima from 1979 to 1985, making her the first female governor of Mexico. Her goal as governor was "educar para progresar" (Educate for progress) While she worked hard for progress as governor, her work did not end there.  She went on to found various organizations such as the Center of Attention to Women, The Mexican Women's Alliance, and The Mexican Association of Social Wellbeing.  She also served her political party, the PRI, as a member of the Caucus on National Ideology in 1978 and 1994 and the National Commission of Honor and Justice of the National Executive Committee in 1994 as well as various other committees and consult groups.

Awards and recognition
Álvarez received various awards and recognitions, most recently the Gold Medal of Fine Arts at the National Palace of Fine Arts in Mexico City on 8 April 2008.  However, due to poor health and her age, the award was accepted by her son, Miguel Delgado Álvarez.  She had been bed-ridden for a year, but in very stable condition as her son was quoted as saying she had been out of the hospital for more than a year and that her vital signs were all normal.

References 

1913 births
2009 deaths
Governors of Colima
Mexican women poets
20th-century Mexican poets
20th-century Mexican women writers
Writers from Guadalajara, Jalisco
Politicians from Guadalajara, Jalisco
20th-century Mexican politicians
Women governors of States of Mexico
20th-century Mexican women politicians